Goya: A Life in Song is a musical theatre work with music and lyrics by American  composer Maury Yeston originally released in 1989 as a concept album. Sony made a Spanish-language version of the musical entitled Goya: Una vida hecha canción in 1992. Both albums starred Spanish tenor Plácido Domingo. A song from Goya, "Till I Loved You," became a hit single.

Background

Popular opera singer Plácido Domingo was interested in starring in a stage musical about Spanish painter Francisco de Goya and suggested to producer Alan Carr that Yeston would be the right person to create the vehicle, since Domingo had admired Yeston's work on the musical Nine.  Because of Domingo's time commitments, however, the musical was made as a concept album.

Releases and singles

Domingo sang the role of Goya, with supporting roles sung by Dionne Warwick, Gloria Estefan, Jennifer Rush (who sang Warwick's parts in the British release of this album), Joe Cerisano,  Richie Havens and Seiko Matsuda (who sang Dionne's parts in the Japan-only release version of this album).  The recording was released by CBS/Sony. Not available for 20 years, Masterworks Broadway released a digitally remastered version of the album on September 28, 2010.

The score featured one break-out song, "Till I Loved You", which was re-recorded by Domingo with singer Jennifer Rush and became a hit in Europe. Domingo and Gloria Estefan recorded a version of the number entitled "Hasta amarte" on the Spanish-language Goya: Una vida hecha canción. It reached #8 on Billboard's Hot Latin Songs chart. The Brazilian edition of the album included a Portuguese version of "Till I Loved You" (Apaixonou) by Domingo and Simone Bittencourt de Oliveira. It was subsequently a US Top 40 hit by Barbra Streisand and Don Johnson. The album itself reached No. 36 in the UK albums chart in June 1989. Thanks to that commercial success, the musical is in the process of developing a major staging.

Track listing 
All titles composed by  Maury Yeston 
 "Overture/Espana" (performed by Paul Hoffert and Plácido Domingo) 4:22     
 "The Astounding Romantic Adventures of Goya/In the Middle of the 18th Century" (performed by Plácido Domingo) 5:34  
 "Girl With a Smile" (performed by Plácido Domingo) 2:05  
 "Till I Loved You" (performed by Plácido Domingo and Dionne Warwick USA / Seiko Matsuda Japan / Jennifer Rush UK Europe ) 4:52  
 "Picture It" ([performed by Gloria Estefan and Joseph Cerisano) 4:34  
 "I Will Paint Sounds" (performed by Plácido Domingo) 4:48  
 "Viva Espana" (performed by The Tsunami Orchestra and Chorus)  5:35  
 "Once a Time (I Loved You)" (performed by Dionne Warwick) 3:43  
 "I Stand Alone" (performed by Plácido Domingo) 3:34  
 "Dog in the Quicksand" (performed by Richie Havens) 3:41
 "Moving On" (performed by Seiko Matsuda) 2:38 
 "Bon Soir" (performed by Plácido Domingo) 2:39  
 "Finale" (performed by Plácido Domingo) 1:42  
 "Hasta Amarte (Till I Loved You)" (performed by Plácido Domingo and Gloria Estefan) 4:50

Notes

1989 albums
Concept albums
1989 musicals
Compositions by Maury Yeston
Plácido Domingo albums
Cultural depictions of Francisco Goya